Lusti is a village in Antsla Parish, Võru County in southeastern Estonia. As of 2021, the population was 178, with a population density of 31.51 people per square kilometer.

References

Villages in Võru County